Wheeleriola is a genus of midges in the family Cecidomyiidae. The one described species in this genus - Wheeleriola perplexa - is known only from New Zeland.

References

Cecidomyiidae genera

Insects described in 2020
Taxa named by Mathias Jaschhof
Taxa named by Catrin Jaschhof
Diptera of New Zealand
Monotypic Diptera genera